Kinetic Traction Systems is a business founded in November 2010, producing Flywheel energy storage systems for electric railways and grid storage.

Technology
Kinetic Traction Systems' main product uses flywheel energy storage technology developed by Pentadyne Power Corp; staff from Pentadyne joined Kinetic. The 36000 RPM flywheels are originally based on uranium centrifuge technology developed by Urenco

KTS' rail-side device uses a brushless DC motor/generator to spin up the flywheel to store electrical energy (for instance, from regenerative braking on trains) as kinetic energy; later to be converted back to electrical energy on demand.

Uses
This system allows significant energy-efficiency improvements in urban rail systems; it has been used by NYC Transit and the London Underground.

Their grid storage system helps stabilise the microgrid on the island of Eigg

Capacity

References

Companies based in California
American companies established in 2010
Electric rail transport
Flywheels
2010 establishments in California